Silaberia (also spelled as Sillaberya, Shilla Berya) is a village in Khejuri II CD block in Contai subdivision of Purba Medinipur district in the state of West Bengal, India.

Geography

Location

Urbanisation
93.55% of the population of Contai subdivision live in the rural areas. Only 6.45% of the population live in the urban areas and it is considerably behind Haldia subdivision in urbanization, where 20.81% of the population live in urban areas.

Note: The map alongside presents some of the notable locations in the subdivision. All places marked in the map are linked in the larger full screen map.

Demographics
As per 2011 Census of India Shilla Berya had a total population of 1,183 of which 604 (51%) were males and 579 (49%) were females. Population below 6 years was 153. The total number of literates in Shilla Berya was 867 (84.17% of the population over 6 years).

Transport
Silaberia is on the Shyampur-Gopichak Road.

Healthcare
Silaberia Rural Hospital at Silaberia (with 30 beds) is the main medical facility in Khejuri II CD block. There is a primary health centre at Janka (with 10 beds).

References

Villages in Purba Medinipur district